Jutul may refer to:

 IL Jutul, Norwegian sports club from Bærum, Akershus
 Jutul (ship)
 Fictional family in Ragnarok (TV series)